The Fort Saskatchewan Cogeneration Plant is a cogeneration plant located on the DOW Chemical Canada's Fort Saskatchewan facility. The facility produces 118MW of electricity from its gas turbines and 100 tonnes per of steam for use in Dow Chemical Canada's facility.

References

Natural gas-fired power stations in Alberta
Power stations in Alberta